Crescendo is a 1970 British horror psychological thriller film directed by Alan Gibson and starring Stefanie Powers, James Olson, Margaretta Scott, Jane Lapotaire and Joss Ackland.  It was made by Hammer Film Productions.

Plot
Drawn to the spectacular south of France to research the late composer Henry Ryman, music student Susan Roberts (Stefanie Powers) encounters his son, drug-addicted Georges (James Olson) and his eccentric family. Investigating the haunting strains of an unfinished Ryman concerto leads Susan to discover an empty piano… and a brutally savaged mannequin! Georges tells her she's the lookalike of his lost love. But Susan may not be the only one at the villa with an eerie doppelgänger.

Cast
 Stefanie Powers as Susan Roberts 
 James Olson as Georges Ryman / Jacques Ryman
 Margaretta Scott as Danielle Ryman 
 Jane Lapotaire as Lillianne 
 Joss Ackland as Carter 
 Kirsten Lindholm as Catherine (as Kirsten Betts)

Production
Alfred Shaughnessy wrote the script in the mid-'60s. In 1966, Michael Reeves approached Hammer Films with the script. James Carreras tried for two years to make it with Joan Crawford but could not get financing. In 1969, the project was reactivated, with Jimmy Sangster hired to rewrite the script and Alan Gibson to direct.

Release
Crescendo premiered in London on 7 May 1970 at the New Victoria Theatre. It received a general release on 7 June 1970 by Warner-Pathé in support of Taste the Blood of Dracula. It was distributed in the United States by Warner Brothers on 29 November 1972.

Box office
Its performance at the box office was disappointing.

Home media
The film was released to DVD by the Warner Archive Collection in March 2009.

Reception
In a contemporary review, the Monthly Film Bulletin found the film to be "Another Hammer horror, and within its own terms quite a spirited offering", noting that Gibson has "injected a gratuitous amount of sex into the story but otherwise presents the usual mixture with sure style and a good eye for colour." The review went on to state that "the dialogue does creak somewhat, but the next Hammer surprise is never far away; even the butler turns out to have been a frequent inmate of asylums, though he seems about as normal as anyone else in the film."

References

Sources

External links

1970 films
1970s thriller films
Films directed by Alan Gibson
Films shot at Associated British Studios
1970s English-language films
Films set in France
British thriller films
Hammer Film Productions films
Films scored by Malcolm Williamson
Films with screenplays by Jimmy Sangster
1970 directorial debut films
1970s British films